Erik Forslund (22 October 1878 – 12 March 1960) was a Swedish actor. He appeared in more than 70 films between 1931 and 1956.

Selected filmography

 A Stolen Waltz (1932)
 Secret Svensson (1933)
 What Do Men Know? (1933)
 The People of Småland (1935)
 South of the Highway (1936)
 Oh, Such a Night! (1937)
 The People of Bergslagen (1937)
 Fransson the Terrible (1941)
 Lasse-Maja (1941)
 I Am Fire and Air (1944)
 The Emperor of Portugallia (1944)
 Oss tjuvar emellan eller En burk ananas (1945)
 Harald the Stalwart (1946)
 Desire (1946)
 The People of Simlang Valley (1947)
 Kvarterets olycksfågel (1947)
 I Am with You (1948)
 Big Lasse of Delsbo (1949)

References

External links

1878 births
1960 deaths
Swedish male film actors
Male actors from Stockholm